Oluwatoyin is a given name of Yoruba origin meaning: "God is worthy to be praised". The diminutive form is Toyin.

Notable people with the name include:
Abike Kafayat Oluwatoyin Dabiri-Erewa, Nigerian politician
Adeola Oluwatoyin Akinbiyi (born 1974), English former professional footballer
Anaïs Oluwatoyin Estelle Marinho (known professionally as Arlo Parks; born 2000), British singer-songwriter
Clara Nneka Oluwatoyin Folashade Chukwurah (born 1964), Nigerian actress
Christianah Oluwatoyin Oluwasesin (1977–2007), Nigerian teacher
Kafayat Oluwatoyin "Kaffy" Shafau (born 1980), Nigerian dancer
Kehinde Oluwatoyin Ladipo, Nigerian geologist
Oluwatoyin Asojo, Nigerian chemistry professor
Oluwatoyin Ogundipe (born 1960), Nigerian academic
Oluwatoyin Salau (2000–2020), American murder victim
Oluwatoyin Sanni, African investment banker
Tolulope Oluwatoyin Sarah Arotile (1995–2020), Nigerian pilot

See also 
Toyin

References

Yoruba given names